is a Japanese actor and tarento. He was born in Mitoyo, Kagawa and made his drama debut as an actor in 2001 in the Tokusatsu Series "Kamen Rider Agito". He appears not only in TV dramas but also in movies, commercial messages, variety TV programs, plays, and music videos. Kaname married a non-celebrity woman April 28, 2013.

Filmography

TV
Kamen Rider Agito (TV Asahi 2001) - as Makoto Hikawa/Kamen Riders G3 & G3-X
Kamen Rider Agito: A New Transformation (TV Asahi 2001) - as Makoto Hikawa/Kamen Rider G3-X
Kono Fuyu no Koi (2002)
Shin Ai no Arashi (2002)
Tensai Yanagisawa kyoju não Seikatsu (2002)
Mantenhan (NHK 2002) - as Takashi Nakashima
Boku to Kanojo to Kanojo no Ikiru Michi (Fuji TV 2003) - as Kishimoto Hajime
Good Luck!! (TBS 2003) - as Takayuki Abe
Kaidan Shin Mimibukuro (2003)
Dōbutsu no Oisha-san (TV Asahi 2003) - as Nikaidou Akio
Kokoro no Teryōri (2003)
Koibumi carta de amor (TBS 2003) - as Wakabayashi Makoto
Leão Sensei (NTV 2003) - as Masaru Hayakawa
Sanji não Oyatsu (2004)
19 Fronteiras (2004)
Chushingura (2004)
Mãe e amante (2004)
Denshi Ga Kireru Made (TV Asahi 2004) - as Mamiya Kyotaro
Presente Últimaラストプレゼント (NTV 2004) - as Aki Rentaro
Naniwa Kin-fazer yu (2005)
Setsuna ni Nite Setsunaku (2005)
Magarikado no Kanojo (Fuji TV 2005) - as Komoto Kazuki
Yaoh SP (TBS 2005) - as Osamu Shu
Tokyo Wonder Tours (2005)
Konya Hitori No Beddo (TBS 2005) - as Ichinose Ryou
Hotaru no Haka (NTV 2005) - as Sawano Yoshie
Yaoh (TBS 2006) - as Osamu Shu
Shōjo niwa Mukanai Shokugyō (2006)
Tantei Gakuen Q SP (NTV 2006) - as Toyama Kintarou (Kinta)
Taiyo no Uta (TBS 2006) - as Kudou Youhei
Kiraware Matsuko no Issho (TBS 2006) - as Ryu Youichi
Tatta Hitotsu no Koi (NTV 2006) - as Tsukioka Tatsuya
Tenshi no Hashigo (2006)
Himitsu no Hanazono (Fuji TV 2007) - as Kataoka Satoshi
Tantei Gakuen Q (NTV 2007) - as Toyama Kintarou (Kinta)
Katagoshi no Koibito (TBS 2007) - as Kikazaki Ryo
Sugata Sanshiro (TV Tokyo 2007) - as Tsukui Josuke
Ashita no Kita Yoshio (Fuji TV 2008) - as Moriwaki Daisuke
Kimi Hannin Janai Yo Ne? (TV Asahi 2008) - as Udagawa NorioTAIYO A UMI NO Kyoshitsu (Fuji TV 2008 EP 2) - as KawabataKoi Kara no Sawagi - Love Stories V (NTV 2008) - as ShunsukeRyusei no Kizuna (TBS 2008) - as Togami YukinariRescue (TBS 2009) - as Katsuragi KosukeGodhand Teru (TBS 2009) - as Shinomiya RenAtashinchi no Danshi (Fuji TV 2009) - as Okura FuuShōkōjo Seira (TBS 2009) - as Yoshito KurisuUntouchable (TV Asahi 2009) - as Toyama ShiroNakanai to Kimeta Hi (Fuji TV 2010) - as Nakahara ShotaRyōmaden (NHK 2010) - as Sawamura SonojLADY Saigo No Hanzai Profile (TBS 2011) - as Terada TakehikoKyō Kara Hitman (2014) - as Tokichi InabaHana Moyu (NHK 2015) - as Irie KuichiPrincess Jellyfish (Fuji TV 2018) - as Yoshio HanamoriManpuku (NHK 2018)Reach Beyond the Blue Sky (NHK 2021) - as Matsudaira YoshinagaThe Grand Family (Wowow 2021) - as Ataru MimaTokyo MER: Mobile Emergency Room (TBS 2021) - as Mikio SenjuMy Ex-Boyfriend's Last Will (Fuji TV 2022) - as Takumi MorikawaLost Man Found (Disney+, NHK 2022)Ranman (2023) - as Akihisa Tanabe

FilmsKamen Rider Agito: Project G4 (2001) - as Makoto Hikawa/Kamen Rider G3-XKamen Rider Ryuki: Episode Final (2002)Janki Kuzure (2003)Tenshi no Kiba (2003)Casshern (2004)Kame wa Igaito Hayaku Oyogu (2005)The Secret Show (2005)Bashment (2005)Udon (2006)Retort Life (2007)Pyū to Fuku! Jaguar (2008)Parallel (2009)Goemon (2009) - as Ishida MitsunariBlood: The Last Vampire (2009)All to the Sea (2010)Girls for Keeps (2012)Age Harassment (2015)Sing My Life (2016)Destiny: The Tale of Kamakura (2017)Over Drive (2018)Out and Out (2018)Kingdom (2019) - as TengTiger: My Life as a Cat (2019)Tokyo MER: Mobile Emergency Room: The Movie (2023) - as Mikio SenjuLove Like the Falling Petals (2022)Kingdom 2: Far and Away (2022) - as Teng

PlaysUsotsuki Yajiro'' (2007)

Music videos
Precious Days/SHY (2004)
Dareka no Negai ga Kanau Koro/Hikaru Utada (2004)
Kaze no Runner/SunSet Swish (2006)
My pace/SunSet Swish (2006)
Natsu ga Kureba/SunSet Swish (2006)

References

External links
Official profile (Japanese)
Official site (Japanese)

1981 births
Japanese male television actors
Living people
Actors from Kagawa Prefecture
21st-century Japanese male actors
Japanese male stage actors
Japanese male film actors
People from Mitoyo, Kagawa